The Coca-Cola Kid is a 1985 Australian romantic comedy film. It was directed by Dušan Makavejev and stars Eric Roberts and Greta Scacchi. The film is based on the short stories The Americans, Baby, and The Electrical Experience by Frank Moorhouse, who wrote the screenplay. It was entered into the 1985 Cannes Film Festival.

Plot
Becker, a hotshot American marketing executive (played by Roberts) from The Coca-Cola Company, visits their Australian operations in Sydney and tries to figure out why a tiny corner of Australia (the fictional town of Anderson Valley) has so far resisted all of Coke's products. He literally bumps into the secretary (played by Scacchi) who is assigned to help him.

Becker discovers that a local producer of soft drinks run by an old eccentric has been successfully fending off the American brand name products. The executive vows an all out marketing war with the eccentric but eventually comes to reconsider his role as a cog in Coca-Cola's giant corporate machinery. Along the way there are humorous subplots involving the office manager's violent ex-husband, Becker's attempt to find the 'Australian sound', and an odd waiter who is under the mistaken belief that Becker is a secret agent.

Cast

Production
David Stratton gave a copy of Frank Moorhouse's book The Americans, Baby to Dusan Makavejev when he attended the Sydney Film Festival in 1975 with Sweet Movie. Production of the movie was difficult in part because of Makavejev's work methods, which were different from the way films were normally made in Australia. Denny Lawrence came on board the film as a consultant.

The Coca-Cola Kid was shot on location in Sydney–various city landmarks can be seen briefly throughout the film.

Reception
Rotten Tomatoes gives The Coca-Cola Kid a rating of 47% from 17 reviews. Roger Ebert gave the film 3 out of 4 stars and said that the movie was "filled with moments of inspiration," but believed that "the last half of the film [...] does not quite deliver on the promises of the first half."

Box office
The Coca-Cola Kid grossed $36,365 at the box office in Australia.

Home media
MGM Home Entertainment released the Region 1 DVD in the United States on 16 April 2002. Umbrella Entertainment released a region free version in May 2009. The DVD includes special features such as the theatrical trailer, and an interview with Greta Scacchi and David Roe titled The Real Thing. Fun City Edition released the film on Blu-ray in the United States on 16 June 2022. In addition to the features included in the 2009 DVD, the Blu-ray contains an interview with Eric Roberts and a new audio commentary.

Accolades

See also
Cinema of Australia

References

External links

1985 films
1985 romantic comedy films
Coca-Cola in popular culture
Australian romantic comedy films
Films about food and drink
Films directed by Dušan Makavejev
Films based on works by Australian writers
Films based on short fiction
Films shot in Sydney
Films set in Sydney
Works by Frank Moorhouse
1980s English-language films